Wittocossus mokanshanensis is a moth in the family Cossidae. It was described by Franz Daniel in 1945. It is found in China (Zhejiang, Yunnan, Hubei, Sichuan), Thailand and Vietnam.

The length of the forewings is 26–28 mm. The forewings are dark, with a pattern of wavy dark stripes. The basal areas are uniform grey. The hindwings are dark grey.

References

Cossinae
Moths described in 1945